Tha Pho is a subdistrict in the Mueang Phitsanulok District of Phitsanulok Province, Thailand.

Geography
The topology of Tha Pho is flat lowlands. The subdistrict is bordered to the north by Tha Thong, to the east by Bueng Phra, to the south by Wat Phrik and to the west by Bang Rakam District.  Tha Pho lies in the Nan Basin, which is part of the Chao Phraya Watershed.  The Nan River flows through the subdistrict.

Administration
The following is a list of the subdistrict's mubans, which roughly correspond to villages:

Economy
The economy is based on rice farming and other agriculture.

Education

Naresuan University
Naresuan University (abbreviated as Mor Nor for Mahawithayalai Naresuan) is located in Tha Pho. The university is named after King Naresuan the Great, and the campus contains a large statue of him.

Primary schools
The following is a list of primary schools in Tha Pho:
Wat Sakat Namman School
Wat Yang En School
Wat Khung Wari School
Ban Khlong Nong Lek School

Kindergartens
The following is a list of kindergartens (nursing care) in Tha Pho:
Faculty of Nursing Naresuan University Nursery
Ban Wang Won Nursing care
Ban Yang En Nursing care
Ban Wang Somsa Nursing care
Ban Khlong Nong Lek Nursing care
Ban Khung Wari Nursing care

References

Tambon of Phitsanulok province
Populated places in Phitsanulok province